All Saints Church, West Stourmouth, is a redundant Anglican church in the civil parish of Stourmouth, Kent, England. It is recorded in the National Heritage List for England as a designated Grade I listed building, and is under the care of the Churches Conservation Trust.

History

The main fabric in the church is Anglo-Saxon.  Alterations were made in the late 12th century. The church was damaged in an earthquake in 1382, and was subsequently rebuilt. Windows were replaced in the 14th and 15th centuries.  The church was restored in 1845, when the seating was reorganised.  It has been redundant since 1979.

Architecture

Exterior
The church is constructed in flint with stone dressings and tiled roofs.  Its plan consists of a nave with north and south aisles, a chancel, a south porch, and a west tower.  The tower is weatherboarded with a shingled spire, and is supported by two 17th-century massive brick buttresses.  Between the buttresses is a porch, above which is a 15th-century two-light window.  The south aisle has a brick parapet and contains three two-light ogee-headed 14th-century windows.  The south porch is gabled with corner buttresses. The east wall of the chancel was rebuilt in the 19th century, and contains a Decorated style window.  In the south wall are two lancet windows, and there is a similar window on the north side.  Only the lower half of the north aisle survives, and it contains two hipped dormers.

Interior
The chancel has dado panelling, a piscina and choir stalls, all dating from the 17th century.  The base of a rood screen with four panels is still present.  Also dating from the 17th century are an octagonal pulpit and box pews.  In the chancel is a brass dated 1472.  There are fragments of 15th-century glass in the south window of the chancel. Also in the church are the royal arms of George III.

Parish Status

The church is part of a joint benefice which includes:
St Nicholas' Church, Ash	
All Saints' Church, Chillenden	
Elmstone Church	
Holy Cross Church, Goodnestone
St Mildred' Church, Preston	
St Mary's Church, Wingham

See also
List of churches preserved by the Churches Conservation Trust in South East England

References

Stourmouth
Church of England church buildings in Kent
Churches with elements of Anglo-Saxon work
English Gothic architecture in Kent
Churches preserved by the Churches Conservation Trust
Former Church of England church buildings